The Colin Archer Peninsula is located on the northwestern Devon Island, a part of the Qikiqtaaluk Region of the Canadian territory of Nunavut. It stretches eastward into Baffin Bay. It is named in honor of Colin Archer, naval architect and shipbuilder.

Fauna and flora
The peninsula is frequented by wintering bearded seals, ringed seals, polar bears, and walrus.

Cape Vera, at the eastern end of the peninsula, is a breeding site for the northern fulmar.

References

Peninsulas of Qikiqtaaluk Region
Devon Island